The Jharokha is a stone window projecting from the wall face of a building, in an upper story, overlooking a street, market, court or any other open space. A common feature in classical Indian architecture, most prominent in Rajasthan. It is supported on two or more brackets or corbelling, has two pillars or pilasters, balustrade and a cupola or pyramidal roof; technically closed by jali but generally partly open for the inmates to peep out to see passing processions. The jharokha is more formal and ornamental than English or French oriel window, and is one of the most distinctive characteristics of the façade in medieval Indian architecture until the 19th century.

Jharokha Darshan 

The jharokha darshan of rulers was a structure for displaying the ruler to his court or people rather than allowing inhabitants of the palace to look out unseen.  It was therefore more open, and not necessarily built projecting out from its wall.

See also
Matroneum

References

External links

 ArchNet Dictionary of Indian Architecture: Jharokha

Rajasthani architecture
Architecture in India
Architectural elements
Islamic architectural elements
Passive cooling
Passive ventilation